Franz Joseph Sigismund von Roggenbach (1726–1794) was the Prince-Bishop of Basel from 1782 to 1794.

Biography

Franz Joseph Sigismund von Roggenbach was born in Zwingen on 14 December 1726, the son of Franz Josef Konrad von Roggenbach and his wife Maria Anna Eva Blarer von Wartensee.

He was educated at the Jesuit gymnasium in Porrentruy.  He became a canon of Basel Münster in 1742, and then became its capitulary in 1750.

On 25 November 1782 the cathedral chapter of Basel Münster unanimously elected Roggenbach to be the new Prince-Bishop of Basel, with Pope Pius VI confirming his appointment on 18 July 1783.  He was consecrated as a bishop by Raymond de Durfort, Archbishop of Besançon, on 29 September 1783.

Shortly after Roggenbach's election, revolutionary activity began in the prince-bishopric, encouraged by Roggenbach's auxiliary bishop, Jean-Baptiste-Joseph Gobel, a supporter of the sans-culottes.  The French Revolution eventually spread into the prince-bishopric, and, following rioting in Porrentruy, Roggenbach fled the prince-bishopric on 27 April 1792, under the protection of Austrian troops, traveling first to Delémont, then to Biel, and finally to Konstanz.  On 17 December 1792 the French First Republic incorporated the northern part of the Prince-Bishopric of Basel into a new client state known as the Rauracian Republic.

Roggenbach died in Konstanz on 9 March 1794.

References

1726 births
1794 deaths
Prince-Bishops of Basel